The 1949 Arizona Wildcats football team represented the University of Arizona in the Border Conference during the 1949 college football season.  In their first season under head coach Bob Winslow, the Wildcats compiled a 2–7–1 record (2–4 against Border opponents) and were outscored by opponents, 298 to 118. The team captains were Max Spilsbury and Roy Rivenburg.  The team played its home games in Arizona Stadium in Tucson, Arizona.

Schedule

References

Arizona
Arizona Wildcats football seasons
Arizona Wildcats football